Waldir is a Portuguese given name, most commonly used in Brazil, derived from the German name Walter. It may refer to:

 Waldir Guerra
 Waldir Pereira
 Waldir Lucas Pereira
 Waldir Pires
 Waldir Sáenz
 Waldir Azevedo

See also 

 all articles starting with "Waldir"
 Valdir
 	

Brazilian given names